The language tax is an economic concept proposed by the Belgian economist Philippe Van Parijs. It is intended to compensate countries with a less widespread language for their expenses for teaching and translation.

Van Parijs points out that Jonathan Pool had proposed this kind of taxation in 1991 but criticizes Pool's proposal to distribute the cost of language learning on a per capita basis.

An analogous concept is found in the work of the Swiss economist François Grin, who argues that such countries are implicitly paying an impôt linguistique (literally also meaning "language tax") to countries with a "strong" language. In a similar sense, the Italian Radicals party speaks of a tassa inglese ("English tax").

See also 
 Economics of language

References 

Linguistic rights
Political terminology
Taxation and redistribution